Tony Lydell "Alligator" Bennett (born July 1, 1967) is a former professional American football linebacker. He was a first-round draft choice of the Green Bay Packers out of the University of Mississippi in the 1990 NFL Draft. He finished his pro career with the Indianapolis Colts.  When he retired, he was fourth on the Packers' all-time sacks list. Bennett is the uncle of former running back Michael Bennett.

External links
 NFL.com player page

1967 births
Living people
American football linebackers
American football defensive ends
Ole Miss Rebels football players
Green Bay Packers players
Indianapolis Colts players